Anchovy paste is a fish paste food product prepared using anchovies as a primary ingredient. It is used as a condiment and as an ingredient in various dishes, such as Scotch woodcock, and is a mass-produced product. It has been used for centuries to provide flavor to foods and as a source of nutrients, and it is a part of the cuisines of Great Britain, Italy, the Philippines and Vietnam. It is a major export product of Morocco.

Overview
Anchovy is used as a condiment and as an ingredient in various dishes. Basic ingredients in its preparation includes mashed anchovies, vinegar, spices and water, and some commercial preparations are produced using these ingredients. Butter is also sometimes used as a base ingredient, and the resultant product is sometimes referred to as "anchovy butter", and in French as beurre d'anchois.

History
Anchovy paste has been used for centuries as a source of nutrients and to provide flavour to foods. Allec, a food byproduct used as a condiment that dates to the times of classical antiquity and Ancient Rome, is the paste left over from the preparation of liquamen (a predecessor to garum prepared using various oily fish, including anchovies) that has been described as a "precursor to anchovy paste". Anchovy paste has also been described as a "descendant of garum".

Mass production
Anchovy paste is a mass-produced product, and is sometimes produced using leftover anchovies from anchovy packing facilities that are processed, mixed with additional ingredients, and packaged into tubes. Circa the early 1900s, food colouring was sometimes used in commercial preparations of the paste. Today, anchovy paste is a major export product of Morocco.

Notable brands
Gentleman's Relish is a brand of mass-produced spiced anchovy paste that was introduced in England in 1828.

Use in dishes
Some uses of anchovy paste include its use as a condiment or ingredient in egg dishes and on toast. It can be used as an ingredient in some hors d'oeuvre. Anchovy paste is a common food in Italy, where it is used served atop canapés and vegetables and as an ingredient in sauces and pasta dishes. It is also a part of the cuisine of the Philippines, where it is referred to as bagoong balayan, and of Vietnam, where it is referred to as mam nem. Anchovy paste can be used as an ingredient in the preparation of anchovy sauce.

Scotch woodcock is a British savoury dish prepared using scrambled eggs atop toast that has been spread with anchovy paste or Gentleman's Relish. Whole anchovies are also sometimes used in the dish.

See also

References

Anchovy dishes
Condiments
Food paste